She Killed in Ecstasy is a 1971 West German-Spanish erotic thriller film directed by Jesús Franco. The film's plot borrows elements from previous Franco films Miss Muerte and Venus in Furs. The film's productions staff includes many cast members and nearly the same crew as his previous film Vampyros Lesbos.

Plot

Dr. Johnson (Fred Williams) lives in bliss with his beautiful wife (Soledad Miranda) until his unorthodox experiments with human embryos causes a medical committee to reject his findings and orders him to discontinue his work. The unstable doctor slashes his wrists in the bathroom. Devastated, his wife vows to seduce and kill the woman and three men "responsible" for the suicide.

Cast
 Soledad Miranda as Mrs. Johnson (as Susann Korda)
 Fred Williams as Dr. Johnson
 Ewa Strömberg as Dr. Crawford (as Ewa Stroemberg)
 Paul Muller as Dr. Franklin Houston (as Paul Müller)
 Howard Vernon as Prof. Jonathan Walker
 Horst Tappert as Police Inspector
 Jesús Franco as Dr. Donen (uncredited)
 Rudolph Hertzog Jr. as Congress participant (uncredited)
 Karl-Heinz Mannchen as Congress participant (uncredited)

Production

The film was shot in July 1970 in Calp, Spain, less than a month after finishing his previous film Vampyros Lesbos (1971). Franco utilized the same cinematographer, film editor, and film composers as he had on Vampyros Lesbos as well as some of the cast including Soledad Miranda, Ewa Strömberg and Paul Muller.

The architecture of Ricardo Bofill features prominently in the film, in particular Xanadu.

The film re-uses plot elements from Franco's previous films Miss Muerte and Venus in Furs (1969).

Release
She Killed in Escstacy was released on December 10, 1971 in Germany.

The film was released on DVD in the United States by Synapse Films in 2000.  It was subsequently re-released by Image Entertainment in 2004.  Both versions are currently out of print.

Severin Films released the film on April 14, 2015 for the first time on Blu-ray in the United States.

Reception
The online film database Allmovie gave the film their lowest rating of one star out of five, but noted that "A distinctive visual style, replete with surrealistic photography by Manuel Merino, sets this film apart from scores of similar sex-horror entries flooding the market in the early 1970s." The assistant professor Danny Shipka of Louisiana State University, referred to the film as "one of Franco's strongest of the 70's", praising actress Soledad Miranda opining to it as the "most intense performance of her career". Shipka went on to note that the film contains all the excesses of Franco's filmmaking including "stilted dialogue" and "scenes that stretch out for extra ordinary periods of time".

See also

Spanish films of 1971
List of horror films of 1971
List of German films: 1970s

Notes

References

External links
 

1971 horror films
1971 films
Films directed by Jesús Franco
Films shot in Spain
Spanish horror films
German horror films
1970s German-language films
West German films
Spanish erotic thriller films
German erotic thriller films
Spanish films about revenge
German films about revenge
German serial killer films
Remakes of Spanish films
1970s erotic thriller films
Spanish LGBT-related films
German LGBT-related films
1970s German films
1970s Spanish films